Izbišta is a village in the Resen Municipality of North Macedonia. It is close to the entry to the mountain pass between the Galičica and Bigla mountain ranges. The village is also home to FK Ilinden, a local football club.

Demographics
Izbišta has 176 residents as of the most recent census in 2002. The village's population has historically consisted mainly of ethnic Macedonians.

References

Villages in Resen Municipality